Balaka (Bengali: বলাকা: English: "A Flight of Swans") is a Bengali poetry book written by Rabindranath Tagore. It was published in 1916. It is the first significant work of the "Balaka Stage" of Rabindranath's poetry.

Dedication 
Tagore dedicated the book to W. Pearson. He was his friend.

Theme 
Rabindranath was a worshipper of speed. The melody of consciousness  of the poet-mind is evident in the book. The dynamics of creation, the mystery of eternal velocity in the universe is observed in it.

References

External links 
 rabindra-rachanabali.nltr.org

1916 poetry books
Bengali poetry collections
Poetry collections by Rabindranath Tagore
Indian_poetry_books